PalaDozza is an indoor sporting arena located at Piazza Azzarita Manfredi 8, in Bologna, Italy. It was named after Giuseppe Dozza, the long-time communist mayor of Bologna, who served from 1945 to 1966. In Italy, the arena is frequently nicknamed Il Madison, after Madison Square Garden. The seating capacity of the arena for basketball games is 5,721 people. It is currently home to the Virtus and Fortitudo Bologna professional basketball teams.

History
The arena was inaugurated in 1956. The arena hosted the FIBA European Champions Cup's 1965–66 season's Final Four, in which the Italian club Simmenthal Milano, won the competition. It was played in front of an 8,000 capacity crowd.

Bruce Dickinson's first live show with Iron Maiden was performed here in October of 1981.

See also
 List of indoor arenas in Italy

References

External links

Official website 
PalaDozza.org Video of the Arena
 BolognaWelcome.com PalaDozza 

Basketball venues in Italy
Indoor arenas in Italy
Sports venues in Bologna
Virtus Bologna
Basketball in Emilia-Romagna